An intermediate-range ballistic missile (IRBM) is a ballistic missile with a range  of 3,000–5,500 km (1,864–3,418 miles), between a medium-range ballistic missile (MRBM) and an intercontinental ballistic missile (ICBM). Classifying ballistic missiles by range is done mostly for convenience; in principle there is very little difference between a low-performance ICBM and a high-performance IRBM, because decreasing payload mass can increase range over ICBM threshold. The range definition used here is used within the U.S. Missile Defense Agency. Some other sources include an additional category, the long-range ballistic missile (LRBM), to describe missiles with a range between IRBMs and true ICBMs. The more modern term theatre ballistic missile encompasses MRBMs and SRBMs, including any ballistic missile with a range under .

The progenitor for the IRBM was the A4b winged rocket, based on the V-2 (officially called A4) rocket used by Nazi Germany at the end of World War II.

History
The progenitor for the IRBM was the A4b rocket winged for increased range and based on the famous V-2 (Vergeltung, or "Reprisal", officially called A4) rocket designed by Wernher von Braun; the V-2 was widely used by Nazi Germany at the end of World War II to bomb English and Belgian cities. The A4b was the prototype for the upper stage of the A9/A10 rocket. The goal of the program was to build a missile capable of bombarding New York when launched in France or Spain (see Amerika Bomber). A4b rockets were tested a few times in December 1944 and January and February 1945. All of these rockets used liquid propellant. The A4b used an inertial guidance system, while the A9 would have been controlled by a pilot. They started from a non-mobile launch pad.

Following World War II von Braun and other lead Nazi scientists were secretly transferred to the United States to work directly for the U.S. Army through Operation Paperclip developing the V-2 into the weapon for the United States.

IRBMs are currently operated by the People's Republic of China, India, Israel, and North Korea. The United States, USSR, Pakistan, United Kingdom, and France were former operators.

Nomenclature
There is no clearly agreed-upon distinction between an intermediate-range and a medium range (MRBM) missile, and the categories overlap. Different sources will classify missiles in different ways. They are both distinct from ICBMs in that they have a range that is less than intercontinental, and hence must be based relatively close to the target. An IRBM, in general, is intended as a strategic weapon, while a MRBM, in general, is intended as a theatre ballistic missile.

Specific IRBMs

See also
 Intercontinental ballistic missile (ICBM)
 ICBM
 List of ICBMs
 Short-range ballistic missile (SRBM)
 Medium-range ballistic missile (MRBM)
 Submarine-launched ballistic missile (SLBM)
 Anti-ship ballistic missile (ASBM)
 Hypersonic cruise missile
 Intermediate-Range Nuclear Forces Treaty

References

Intermediate-range
Missile types
Wernher von Braun